Events from the year 1805 in Austria

Incumbents
 Monarch – Francis II

Events

 
 - Battle of Amstetten
 - Capitulation of Dornbirn
 - Battle of Dürenstein order of battle
 - Battle of Dürenstein
 - Battle of Mariazell
 - Battle of Schöngrabern
 - Battle of Austerlitz. A decisive victory for the French army over Austria and Russia.

Births

 Sophie Friederike Dorothea - Archduchess -  January 27 (1805-1872) Born in Vienna
Adalbert Stifter -  Austrian Writer - October 23 (1805-1868) Born in Oberplan, Bohemia 
Anton Ritter von Schmerling - Austrian Statesman - August 23 (1805-1893) Born in Vienna

Deaths

References

1805 in Austria
Years of the 19th century in Austria